Tsai Ling-yi (born 6 November 1952) was the Second Lady of the Republic of China from 2012 to 2016. She is the wife of Wu Den-yih, the former Vice President of the Republic of China.

Born as Tsai Ying-tao (蔡櫻桃) in a fishing village in Yilan County, Tsai married Wu Den-yih in 1970, and has four children. She helped her husband's constituency service in Nantou County when he was a Member of the Legislative Yuan, and also actively participated in political campaigns of Wu Den-yih and Kuomintang.

References

1952 births
Living people
Second ladies of the Republic of China
Politicians of the Republic of China on Taiwan from Yilan County, Taiwan